The Crawford Auto-Aviation Museum is a transportation museum in Cleveland, Ohio, United States. It is part of the Western Reserve Historical Society's Cleveland History Center in University Circle, and its collection includes about 170 cars. It was founded by Frederick C. Crawford of TRW, and opened in 1965.

Collections 
As of 2019 there were more than 170 automobiles, 12 aircraft, 3 antique carriages, and 21 non-car artifacts (motorcycles, boats and bicycles).

The aviation collection includes a P-51 Mustang racing plane used in Thompson Trophy Races. The oldest car in the collection is an 1897 Panhard et Levassor, while later acquisitions include the first production DeLorean from 1981 and a self-driving car named DEXTER which was team Team Case's entry in the DARPA Urban Challenge 2007, in which it placed in the top 20.

Other vehicles in the collection include Tinkerbelle, a small sailboat in which Robert Manry solo sailed across the Atlantic Ocean in 1965. Manry donated it to the Historical Society in 1967.

In 2016, the museum's 1913 ALCO Model Six Berline Limousine won the Ansel Adams Award at the Pebble Beach Concours d'Elegance in California.

History 
The collection began as the Thompson Products Auto Album, which was also founded by Crawford. Crawford explained that when he started collecting the cars, it was simply because it seemed a shame to let them be scrapped, which was the typical fate of almost all antique machinery at the time. He saw value in saving a few historically significant examples.

In 1990, the museum sold off almost 70 automobiles by putting them up for auction with Sotheby's.

To pay down debt, the museum sold or auctioned 44 cars in 2009, 24 of them through RM Auctions in October. The deaccessions proceeded over public protest and the objections of Kay Crawford, the widow of founder Frederick C. Crawford. The museum also sold a Goodyear F2G Corsair it had purchased from Walter Soplata and a Airco DH.4 originally acquired by Crawford.

As of 2018, the museum featured two major exhibits: Setting the World in Motion, featuring cars and airplanes made in Northeast Ohio, and REVolution: The Automobile in America, telling the story of the automobile in America.

See also
List of aerospace museums
List of automobile museums
List of museums in Ohio

References

External links

 Official website

Aerospace museums in Ohio
Automobile museums in Ohio
Museums in Cleveland
University Circle